Basketball event was contested for men only at the 1989 Summer Universiade in Duisburg, West Germany.

References
 Universiade basketball medalists on HickokSports

1989 in basketball
basketball
1989
International basketball competitions hosted by Germany